Rajaratnam Kumaravadivel is a Sri Lankan Tamil physicist, Emeritus professor, former dean of the Faculty of Science, University of Jaffna and former acting vice-chancellor of the University of Jaffna.

Early life
Kumaravadivel joined the University of Ceylon, graduating in 1967 with first class honours BSc degree. He was also the first to receive both a first class honours degree specialising in physics (1970) and the Hewavitharana memorial prize for best performance in Physics from the University of Ceylon. He then received a PhD degree in Physics from the University of Bristol in 1975 after producing a thesis titled ''Theory of Thermodynamic Properties of Liquid Metals”

Career
Kumaravadivel served as a lecturer at the Department of Physics at Peradeniya Campus of the University of Sri Lanka between January 1978 and January 1979. Whilst at Peradeniya, he helped in conducting final year Physics undergraduate lectures for the newly formed Department of Physics at the University of Jaffna. Jaffna being his hometown, he later moved permanently to University of Jaffna as one of the founding members of the Department of Physics.  During his tenure, Kumaravadivel took different administrative roles and contributed immensely to the growth of the department. He served as Head of the Department of Physics for three terms: February 1985 to February 1988; March 1991 to June 1991; and April 1994 to November 1999, steering the department through the difficult times of the ethnic conflict in Sri Lanka. He led the Computer Unit (computing facility) at the University from August 1989 to October 1990, during its formative years.   

Kumaravadivel also held  several research fellowships. He was appointed as an associate member of the International Center for Theoretical Physics from 1982-1987 and 1989-1995 and a visiting scientist at the same institute from 1983-1984. He obtained a Commonwealth fellowship to work as a visiting professor at the Cavendish Laboratory, University of Cambridge in 1990.  

Kumaravadivel later was appointed as Dean of the Faculty of Science from November 1999 to July 2010. He was the University Grants Commission (Sri Lanka) nominee for the Vice-Chancellorship of the University of Jaffna for three consecutive times - in 2000, 2003 and 2006. He was appointed as acting Vice-Chancellor of the University between June 2006 and December 2007 after the nominee Ratnajeevan Hoole did not take up his post. After retirement  Kumaravadivel served as the member of the University Grants Commission  from May 2015 -January 2020. He is currently an  Emeritus Professor of Physics at the University of Jaffna

References

Academic staff of the University of Jaffna
Academic staff of the University of Sri Lanka
Alumni of the University of Bristol
Alumni of the University of Ceylon
Living people
Sri Lankan Tamil academics
Sri Lankan Tamil physicists
Sri Lankan Tamil writers
Year of birth missing (living people)